The 24 Caprices for Solo Violin were written in groups (six, six and twelve) by Niccolò Paganini between 1802 and 1817. They are also designated as M.S. 25 in Maria Rosa Moretti's and Anna Sorrento's Catalogo tematico delle musiche di Niccolò Paganini which was published in 1982. The Caprices are in the form of études, with each number exploring different skills (double stopped trills, extremely fast switching of positions and strings, etc.)

Ricordi first published them in 1820, where they were grouped and numbered from 1 to 24 as Op. 1, together with 12 Sonatas for Violin and Guitar (Op. 2 and 3) and 6 Guitar Quartets (Op. 4 and 5). When Paganini released his Caprices, he dedicated them "alli artisti" (to the artists) rather than to a specific person. A sort of dedication can be recognized in Paganini's own score, where he annotated between 1832 and 1840 the following 'dedicatee' for each Caprice (possibly ready for a new printed edition): 1: Henri Vieuxtemps; 2: Giuseppe Austri; 3: Ernesto Camillo Sivori; 4: Ole Bornemann Bull; 5: Heinrich Wilhelm Ernst; 6: Karol Józef Lipiński; 7: Franz Liszt; 8: Delphin Alard; 9: Herrmann; 10: ; 11: Sigismond Thalberg; 12: Dhuler; 13: Charles Philippe Lafont; 14: Jacques Pierre Rode; 15: Louis Spohr; 16: Rodolphe Kreutzer; 17: Alexandre Artôt; 18: Antoine Bohrer; 19: Andreas Jakob Romberg; 20: Carlo Bignami; 21: Antonio Bazzini; 22: Luigi Alliani; 23: [no name]; 24: Nicolò Paganini,  (to my self, regrettably buried).

Ferdinand David's first edition was published by Breitkopf & Härtel in 1854. David, as editor, also issued an edition of Caprices with piano accompaniments by Robert Schumann. Another edition by David was issued in two books of 12 caprices each "" (with additional piano accompaniment by Ferdinand David) and published by Breitkopf & Härtel (c. 1860).

Unlike many earlier and later sets of 24 pieces, there was no intention to write these caprices in 24 different keys.

Details

Scores
Curci, 1982)

Complete set / commercial recordings
In 1940, to celebrate the centenary of Paganini's death, the complete set in the arrangement for violin and piano by Ferdinand David was recorded by the 20-year-old Austrian violinist Ossy Renardy (pseudonym of Oskar Reiss), with Walter Robert on piano (78 rpm's, RCA Victor; CD reprint by Biddulph). This was the world premiere recording of any version of the 24 Caprices. Renardy had played the solo violin version of the 24 in his Carnegie Hall debut the previous October. In 1953, shortly before his untimely death, Renardy recorded the 24 again (on Paganini's Guarnieri del Gesù violin, 'Il Cannone'), in the same arrangement by David, with Eugene Helmer accompanying (2LPs, Remington R-99-146 & R-99-152).

In 1947, Ruggiero Ricci made the first complete recording of the 24 Caprices in their original version (Decca). Ricci later made further recordings, as stated below:
1947 | 2LPs | Decca LK.4025 Nos.1–12; LXT.2588 Nos.13–24 -mono-; 1950 reprint | 2LPs | London Decca LL.264 Nos.1–12; LL.252 Nos.13–24 mono (London, July 1947)
1959 | LP | Decca LXT.5569 -mono- / SXL.2194 -stereo- (Victoria Hall, Geneva, 1–9 April 1959)
1973 | LP | Vox Turnabout TV-S 34528  | + premiere recording of Caprice d'adieu in E major, MS 68 (USA, 1973)
1978 | 2LP | Price-Less C–93042 (CD reprint: Price-Less D12179) | "Golden Jubilee" – recorded direct-to-disc at Soundstage Recording Studio, Toronto, Canada | + Caprice d'adieu in E major, MS 68 + Duo merveille in C major, MS 6 (Toronto, 1978)
1988 | CD | Radio Vaticana 061–003 / Biddulph LAW 016 | performed on Paganini's Guarneri del Gesù "Il Cannone" (Genova, 16–20 April 1988)
1998 | CD | Dynamic CDS244 | 80th Birthday Concert, live in Szeged Synagogue, Hungary | version for violin and orchestra by Laszlo Meszlény (Nos.1–23) and Chris Nicholls (No.24), based on the piano accompaniment composed by Robert Schumann (Hungary, 17 May 1998)
1982 | LaserDisc-NTSC | One Eleven, Ltd. URS-V-91610 | 69 mins. | BBC Scotland, Live television performance (p)1991
1987 | VHS-NTSC | Shar Products Company RR–1 (Michigan University, 10 January 1987) | unedited performance

Other violinists have since recorded the complete set, including:
 Accardo, Salvatore (1st rec: RCA Italia, 1970 / 2nd rec: DGG, 1977 / 3rd rec: Foné, 2002)
  (Fonit Cetra Italia, 1981) – from the original Paganini's manuscript
 Barton-Pine, Rachel (Avie, 2017)
 Becker-Bender, Tanja (Hyperion, 2007)
 Berick, Yehonatan (Equilibrium, 2014)
Berman, Pavel (iClassical Academy, Italy 2018, complete set of all 24 Caprices on video; instructional lessons and performances)
 Chumachenco, Nicolas (Edelweiss, 1982)
  (Italian issue – DGG, 2012)
 Ehnes, James (1st rec: Telarc, 1995 / 2nd rec: Onyx, 2009) – unedited performance, each caprice recorded in a single take
 Erlih, Devy (Adès, 1967 / CD reprint, 1987 (selection of 19 from the 24 Caprices: Nos. 2, 3, 8, 22 & 23 are not included)
 Fedotov, Maxim (Russian and Japanese issue – Triton, 1996)
 Fischer, Julia (Decca Classics, 2008/09)
 Garrett, David (DGG, 1996) – w. Bruno Canino, playing the Robert Schumann piano accompaniment for Nos. 1–23
 Gitlis, Ivry (Philips, 1976) – released in 2007
 Gringolts, Ilya (Orchid Classics, 2012)
 Hadelich, Augustin (Warner Classics, 2017/8)
 Ibragimova, Alina (Hyperion, 2021)
 Kaler, Ilya (Naxos, 1992)
 Kamio, Mayuko (Japanese issue – BMG/RCA Victor Red Seal, 2009) – CD+DVD features an interview with Kamio
 Kavakos, Leonidas (Dynamic, 1989/90)
 Kinga, Augustin (RovenRecords, 2016)
 Koelman, Rudolf (Wiediscon, 1996 / CD reprint: Hänssler, 2003) – 1996 live recording
 Kováč, Tibor (Gramola, 1999)
 Malikian, Ara (Warner Classics Apex, 2002) – <small>Warner claim this to be the first complete recording made of the caprices, following the repetition marks included in the autograph score. Total playing time: 100'25</small>
 Markov, Alexander (DVD Warner Music Vision + CD Erato, 1989) – 'live' recording, 3 May 1989. DVD Film directed by Bruno Monsaingeon
 Midori (Sony Classical, 1988)
 Milanova, Vanya (Simax, 1985)
 Milenkovich, Stefan (Dynamic, 2002/03) – 2-CD set with 'the complete music for solo violin'
 Mintz, Shlomo (DGG, 1981)
 Paetsch, Michaela (Teldec, 1987)
 Papavrami, Tedi (Aeon, 1997 + 2001) – 2-CD set with two different recordings: 1997 studio version + 19 April 2001, 'live' in Tokyo
 Pasquier, Régis (Auvidis Valois, 1991)
 Perlman, Itzhak (EMI, 1972)
 Poulet, Gérard Georges (French issue – LP Deesse DDLX 178, 1979)
 Rabin, Michael (Capitol, 1958)
 Rogliano, Marco (Tactus, 2000)
 Shunsuke Sato (Japanese issue – Universal Classics, 2009) – performed on pure gut strings
 Shimizu, Takashi (Japanese issue – Platz, 1990)
 Spivakovsky, Tossy (Omega Classics, 1966) – w. Lester Taylor, playing the Robert Schumann piano accompaniment for Nos. 1–23
 Stadler, Sergei (Melodiya, 1983)
  (Arts Music, 2002)
 Zalai, Antal (Budapest, 4–13 August 2015)
 Zehetmair, Thomas (1st rec: Teldec, 1992 / 2nd rec: ECM Records, 2007)
 Zhislin, Grigori (Dante Productions LYSC 002, 1997)
 Zimmermann, Frank Peter (EMI, 1984/85) – plays the first twelve Caprices on a Stradivari of 1706 and the remainder on a Stradivari of 1684
 Zukofsky, Paul (Vanguard Classics, 1970) – so-called 'authentic' performance based on the original manuscript

Complete set / live, not commercial recordings
 Madoyan, Nikolay (live recording | 4 November 2003, San Donato Church Genoa, Italy)

Arrangements
Violin and Piano
 version of No. 24 by composer himself, for violin and piano or guitar published separately as  piano accompaniments for Nos. 1–23 by Robert Schumann (1855)
 arrangement of Nos. 1–24 by Ferdinand David for violin and piano (c. 1860)
 version of the 24 caprices "" by John Liptrot Hatton (1870)
 arrangement of No. 13 by Jenő Hubay (c. 1925)
 arrangement of Nos. 13, 20 and 24 by Fritz Kreisler (1911)
 arrangement of Nos. 17 and 24 by Leopold Auer (1922)
 arrangement of No. 6 by George Enescu
 arrangement of No. 9 "La chasse" by Jacques Thibaud
 arrangement of No. 9 and 23 by Florizel von Reuter
 arrangement of No. 9 by Albert Spalding (1918)
 arrangement of Nos. 17 (1926), 9, 13, 19 (1941) and 24 (1918) by Adolf Busch
 arrangement (recomposition with new variations) of No. 24 by Mischa Elman
 arrangement of Nos. 13, 22, 14 (Vol. I), Nos. 21, 15, 9 (Vol. II) and Nos. 20, 24 (Vol. III) by Mario Pilati (1935)
 arrangement of Nos. 13, 17, 24 by Zino Francescatti (1950s)
 re-composition of No. 20 as Concert Caprice by Max Rostal (1955)
 arrangement of No. 24 by Eduard Tubin

Violin and string orchestra
 arrangement of Nos. 13, 24 by Jascha Heifetz, No. 24 is based on Leopold Auer's piano arrangement (1940s)
 arrangement of Nos. 2, 21, 20, 9, 24 as Five Paganini Caprices by Edison Denisov (1985)
 string orchestra accompaniment for Nos. 1–24 by Giedrius Kuprevičius

Viola solo
 arrangement of Nos. 5 and 13 by William Primrose (1933/34)
 arrangement of Nos. 1–24 by Emanuel Vardi (1965)

Viola and piano
 arrangements of No.17 by William Primrose and No. 24 by David Stimer

Cello solo
 arrangement of Nos. 9, 14, 17 by Yo-Yo Ma (1981/82)

Cello and piano
 arrangement of Nos. 13, 20 and 24 by Fritz Kreisler (1911) / re-arranged by Yo-Yo Ma for cello and piano

Flute solo
 arrangement of Nos. 1–24 by Patrick Gallois (1990/91)

Guitar solo
 arrangement of No. 24 by John Williams
 arrangement of Nos. 1–24 by Eliot Fisk (1990/91)
 arrangement of No. 24 by Marcin Patrzalek

Chamber orchestra
 arrangement of No. 24 by Adolf Busch (1918?)

Clarinet and jazz band
 arrangement of No. 24 by Skip Martin and Benny Goodman (1941)

Complete set recordings of arrangements
 Berman, Pavel (Classica HD, 2013) – Orchestra dei Talenti Musicali – live, Biella, Teatro Sociale, 2013 (version with String Orchestra by Giedrius Kuprevičius)
 Boyd, Bonita (flute) (Fleur De Son Classics, 2000) – arranged by Jules Herman for flute
 Drahos, Béla (flute) (Hungarian issue – Radioton, 1996) – arranged by Jules Herman for flute. Première recording of the 24 Caprices performed on the flute
 Fisk, Eliot (guitar) (Nimbus Records, 1991) – arranged by Eliot Fisk for guitar
 Gallois, Patrick (flute) (DGG, 1991) – arranged by Patrick Gallois for flute
 Slapin, Scott (viola) (Eroica Classical Recordings, 2008) – arranged for viola
 Vardi, Emanuel (viola) (Epic SC 6049, 1965) – arranged for viola. Recorded on a 17" Dodd viola in Vardi's home studio
 Wihan String Quartet (Nimbus Alliance, 2009) – arranged by William Zinn for string quartet (Wihan SQ: Leos Cepicky and Jan Schulmeister, violins / Jiri Zigmund, viola / Ales Kasprik, cello)

Original works, based on Paganini's Caprices
Especially for compositions in the form of "Variations" see the related article: Caprice No. 24 (Paganini)#Variations on the theme.

Violin solo
 9 variaciones sobre el capricho núm. 24 de Paganini by Manuel Quiroga (1928)
 12 variaciones sobre el capricho núm. 24 de Paganini by Manuel Quiroga (1942)
 Paganiniana, Variations for violin solo (Tema: Caprice 24; Var. I: Caprice 3; Var. II: Le Streghe; Var. III: Caprice 6; Var. IV: Caprice 14; Var. V: Caprice 21) by Nathan Milstein (1954)
 Paolo Pessina – Paganini Variations Op.25 for Violin and Piano ('ad libitum') dedicated to Ruggiero Ricci (1997)
 50 Caprice Variations (on Caprice No. 24) by George Rochberg (1970)

Violin and piano
 Paganini Variations on the 24th caprice by Eugène Ysaÿe (posthumous ed. 1960)
 Trois caprices de Paganini Op. 40 (re-composition of Nos. 20, 21 and 24) by Karol Szymanowski (1918; rev. 1926)
 Trois caprices de Paganini Op. 97 (re-composition of Nos. 10, 13 and 22) by Darius Milhaud (1927)

Violin and orchestra
 Capriccio dei Capricci (da Paganini, 2 Studi per orchestra di virtuosi), Op. 50, by Franco Mannino (1967)

Piano solo
 Etudes after Paganini Caprices, Op. 3 (on Caprices Nos. 5, 9, 11, 13, 19, 16) by Robert Schumann (1832)
 6 Concert Etudes after Paganini Caprices, Op. 10 (on Caprices Nos. 14, 6, 10, 4, 2, 3) by Robert Schumann (1833)
 Études d'exécution transcendante d'après Paganini, S. 140 (on Caprices Nos. 5+6, 17, 1, 9, 24) by Franz Liszt (1838/40)
 Grandes études de Paganini, S. 141 (on Caprices Nos. 6, 17, 1, 9, 24) by Franz Liszt (1851)
 Variations on a Theme by Paganini, Op. 35 (Book I & II)] (on Caprice No. 24) by Johannes Brahms (1862/63)
 Sonatina Canonica in E major (on Caprices Nos. 20, 19, 11, 14) by Luigi Dallapiccola (1942/43), dedicated to Pietro Scarpini

Two pianos
 Variations on a Theme by Paganini (on Caprice No. 24) by Witold Lutosławski (1941)

Piano and orchestra
 Rhapsody on a Theme of Paganini, Op. 43, (on Caprice No. 24) by Sergei Rachmaninoff (1934)
 Wariacje na temat Paganiniego (on Caprice No. 24) by Witold Lutosławski (1941; rescored 1979)

Orchestra
 re-composition of various Paganini's works as Paganiniana, Op. 65: I. Allegro agitato (on Caprices Nos. 5, 12 and fragments from Nos. 16, 19) by Alfredo Casella (1942)
 Paganini Variations, Op. 26 (on Caprice No. 24) by Boris Blacher (1947)

References

Further reading

Philippe Borer, The Twenty-Four Caprices of Niccolò Paganini. Their significance for the history of violin playing and the music of the Romantic era, Stiftung Zentralstelle der Studentenschaft der Universität Zürich, Zurich, 1997
 Konstantin Georgiyevich Mostras, 24 каприса для скрипки соло Н. Паганини: методические комментарии [=24 Caprices for solo violin solo by N. Paganini: methodical commentaries''] Moscow, Musghiz, 1959 [165 p.]

External links

Caprices for Solo Violin, 24
Paganini
1800s in music
1810s in music
Music with dedications